John Alexander "Jocky" Scott (born 14 January 1948) is a Scottish football coach and former player.

During his playing career he played for Dundee, Aberdeen, Seattle Sounders and Scotland.

An extensive management career followed with spells at Aberdeen, Dundee (three separate spells), Arbroath, Dunfermline Athletic, Notts County, Raith Rovers and Stirling Albion. He also had coaching jobs at other various clubs in both Scotland and England.

Club career 

Scott played club football for Dundee and Aberdeen, winning the Scottish League Cup with both clubs. He memorably scored a hat-trick when Aberdeen beat Rangers 5–1 in the competition's semi-final in  He was capped twice for the Scotland national team in 1971. He was Soccer Bowl 1977 finalist with the Seattle Sounders (lost 1–2 to the New York Cosmos) in the North American Soccer League.

Managerial career 
After his playing career, Scott moved into management. He managed Aberdeen, Dundee (on three separate occasions), Arbroath, Dunfermline Athletic, Notts County, Raith Rovers and Stirling Albion.

He also had coaching roles at Sunderland, Plymouth Argyle and Hibernian. The latter two he also had spells as manager on a caretaker basis.

Aberdeen appointed Scott to their coaching team in September 2012.

Personal life
His father Willie played for Aberdeen and Newcastle United in the 1930s.

Managerial stats 

 Caretaker spells not included.
 Jocky Scott co-managed with Alex Smith at Aberdeen.
 Statistics based on soccerbase information.

Honours

Player
Dundee
 Scottish League Cup: 1973–74

Aberdeen
 Scottish League Cup: 1976–77

Manager
Aberdeen
(as co-manager with Alex Smith)
 Scottish Cup: 1989–90
 Scottish League Cup: 1989–90
Runners-up: 1988–89

Dunfermline Athletic
 Scottish League Cup: runners-up 1991–92

Dundee
 Scottish First Division: 1997–98
Scottish Challenge Cup: 2009-10

References

External links 

Living people
Footballers from Aberdeen
1948 births
Scottish expatriate footballers
Scotland international footballers
Aberdeen F.C. players
Aberdeen F.C. managers
Arbroath F.C. managers
Dundee F.C. players
Dundee F.C. managers
Dunfermline Athletic F.C. managers
Hibernian F.C. non-playing staff
Plymouth Argyle F.C. non-playing staff
Notts County F.C. managers
Raith Rovers F.C. managers
North American Soccer League (1968–1984) players
Seattle Sounders (1974–1983) players
Stirling Albion F.C. managers
Sunderland A.F.C. non-playing staff
Aberdeen F.C. non-playing staff
Scottish Football League managers
Association football forwards
Association football coaches
Scottish footballers
Scottish expatriate sportspeople in the United States
Expatriate soccer players in the United States
Scottish football managers